Oinatz Bengoetxea (born August 28, 1984 in Leitza) is a player of Basque pelota who won the 1st Hand-Pelota singles championship in 2008.

References

External links
https://www.baikopilota.eus/es/pelotaris/bengoetxea-24.html 

Spanish pelotaris
Living people
1984 births
Pelotaris from Navarre
People from Norte de Aralar